This is a list of reservoirs in the Peak District of England, arranged in order of capacity. Most lie within the Peak District National Park, but others lie outside its borders (marked with * in the table below).

See also 

 List of reservoirs in Derbyshire
 List of dams and reservoirs in the United Kingdom

References